Claude Saluden (25 May 1937 – 30 November 1996) was a French boxer. He competed in the men's light welterweight event at the 1956 Summer Olympics.

References

External links
 

1937 births
1996 deaths
French male boxers
Olympic boxers of France
Boxers at the 1956 Summer Olympics
Place of birth missing
Light-welterweight boxers